Karl Hansen may refer to:

Karl Aage Hansen (1921–1990), Danish footballer and Olympic bronze medalist
Karl Hansen (footballer, born 1942), Danish footballer
Karl Hansen (cyclist) (1902–1965), Norwegian cyclist
Karl Hansen (equestrian) (1890–1959), Swedish horse rider 
Karl Hansen (whistleblower), whistleblower for Tesla, Inc.

See also
Carl Hansen (disambiguation)